Castleshane can refer to:
 Castleshane, County Monaghan, a village in County Monaghan, Ireland
 Castleshane (racehorse), a racehorse in Lincolnshire, England